Martín Alund and Horacio Zeballos were the defending champions, but did not participate this year.

Sergio Galdós and Marco Trungelliti won the title, defeating Jean Andersen and Izak van der Merwe 6–4, 6–4 in the final.

Seeds

Draw

Draw

References
 Main Draw

Challenger ATP de Salinas Diario Expreso
2013 Doubles